The West Midlands (Regional) League is an English association football competition for semi-professional and amateur teams based in the West Midlands county, Shropshire, Worcestershire, southern Staffordshire and northern Herefordshire. It has two divisions, the highest of which is Division One, a regional feeder for the National League System (NLS) at the eleventh level of the overall English football league system.

The league was formed in 1889 as the Birmingham & District League to cater for teams in Birmingham and the surrounding area, but soon became established as one of the strongest leagues outside the Football League itself, with teams from as far afield as Bristol and Wales taking part. After the Second World War it absorbed the rival Birmingham Combination to become firmly established as the leading league in the area, but a gradual decline in its status began in the late 1950s and it now operates at a much lower level than in its heyday.  The league acts as a feeder to the Midland Football League Division One, to which one team may be promoted each season, while new members regularly join from a number of lower, more local leagues.

History

Early years
In the late 1880s, Birmingham and the surrounding region boasted many of the country's strongest football teams.  Six of the region's leading clubs joined the first two national leagues set up in England, the Football League and the Football Alliance, but there were still many teams in the area keen to participate in league play.  On 31 May 1889 a meeting took place at Birmingham's Grand Hotel with the view to forming a Birmingham & District League.  A total of 17 clubs were invited but only 13 attended, of which 12 were selected to form the new league, to commence play in the 1889–90 season.  The one club which sent a representative to the meeting but was not invited to take part in the league, for unknown reasons, was Worcester Rovers.

The 12 clubs competing in the league's inaugural season were Aston Victoria, Great Bridge Unity, Hednesford Town, Ironbridge, Kidderminster Harriers, Kidderminster Olympic, Langley Green Victoria, Oldbury Town, Smethwick Carriage Works, Unity Gas Department, Wellington St George's, and Willenhall Pickwick.  Although Kidderminster Olympic topped the final table, no championship was awarded as a number of fixtures had not been completed.  This situation was to be repeated in each of the subsequent two seasons, in both of which Brierley Hill Alliance, who had joined the league for its second season, topped the table but did not win the title.  The early years of the league also saw new teams joining and existing ones dropping out almost every season, but once the league's structure settled down, it came to be regarded as one of the strongest leagues outside the Football League itself, rivalled only by the Southern League and the Midland League.

Despite the league's name, in the years prior to the First World War it came to include teams from as far afield as Bristol, Wrexham and Crewe, as well as including the reserve teams of local Football League clubs.  A number of clubs which had enjoyed success in the Birmingham Combination also joined the league, which was seen as a step up to a better standard of football.  The league's large coverage area began to create problems in the 1930s, however, as many clubs found the long and costly journeys to away matches difficult, and began to drop out in favour of playing in leagues which covered smaller areas.  In 1938, Bangor City, Worcester City, Wellington Town and the reserve teams of Cardiff City and Wrexham all resigned from the league, reducing the numbers so much that instead of the usual format the organising committee decided to run two separate competitions each lasting for half of the 1938–39 season, the first named the Keys Cup and the second the League Cup.  By the time competitive football was abandoned in 1939 due to the outbreak of the Second World War, the rival Birmingham Combination, which had not chosen to accept teams from such a wide area, had consolidated and come to be regarded as the region's top league.

Post-war years
Although the league lost further clubs to the Combination, which was quicker to restart after the war, within a few years the League had regained its position of pre-eminence in the region, increasing to almost twice its pre-war size.  During the 1952–53 season the League's committee proposed a merger of the two competitions, but the Combination rejected the idea, whereupon the Combination's six best teams all resigned and joined the League.  The Combination's committee then attempted to re-open the merger talks but, having just bolstered its ranks with six new members, the League was not interested.  A year later, all of the Combination's 14 remaining clubs, with the exception of West Bromwich Albion's 'A' (third) team, left to join the League, which effectively absorbed its former rival.  The 40 member clubs were split into Northern and Southern divisions, which a year later were re-arranged into Divisions One and Two, with promotion and relegation taking place between the two.

At the end of the 1957–58 season, Burton Albion and Nuneaton Borough left to join an expanding Southern League, followed a year later by Hinckley Athletic.  In an attempt to consolidate the league decided to expel all remaining reserve teams, reducing to a single division of 22 clubs.  Four years later it changed its name to the West Midlands (Regional) League to more accurately reflect its catchment area, which now included very few teams from Birmingham or its immediate environs.  For the 1965–66 season the league was able to revert to a two-division structure when it rebranded its existing single division the Premier Division and added a new Division One.  By 1976, a steady flow of teams joining from smaller regional leagues led to Division One being split into Divisions One (A) and One (B), revised a year later to Divisions One and Two.

Modern era

The Alliance Premier League was formed in 1979, pushing the Regional League further down the English football league system.  Successful Regional League clubs such as Bilston Town, Hednesford Town and Halesowen Town began applying to, and being accepted into, the Southern League, reducing the Regional League to the status of a feeder league, although their departures continued to be offset by a flow of new members from lower-level leagues.  Reflecting the demographics of the West Midlands area, a number of British Asian teams joined the league, including Sikh Hunters, England's first ever all-Sikh team.  At the same time the catchment areas of the Regional League and the Midland Football Combination were increasingly converging, and by the early 1990s the standard of play and geographical coverage of the two competitions were considered to be almost identical.  A new competition was formed in 1994 to cater for the best clubs previously split across the two leagues, and thus the Regional League lost ten of its member clubs to the Midland Football Alliance, further reducing its own status.

The reduction in numbers forced the league to revert to a two-division structure, but within two seasons numbers had grown again to the extent that Division One was split into Divisions One (North) and One (South) for the 1996–97 season, a format retained until 2004 when the two Division Ones were re-organised into Division One and Division Two.  As a result of the COVID-19 pandemic in England, both the 2019–20 and 2020–21 seasons were abandoned, with all 2020 results being expunged, and no promotion or relegation taking place to, from, or within the competition. However, the scheduled restructuring of non-League football took place at the end of the 2020–21 season, with a new division added to the Northern Premier League at Step 4 for 2021–22, which resulted in most of the WMRL's Step 6 clubs being reallocated to other divisions within that step.

Structure
The league currently has no title sponsor. Previously it has been sponsored by Sport Italia, the Wolverhampton-based Express & Star newspaper, and Black Country brewery Banks's. Some of the teams in the lower two divisions are reserve teams of clubs playing at a higher level. Each division is contested on a double round-robin basis, with each team playing each of the other teams in the division once at home and once away. Three points are awarded for a win (increased from two with effect from the 1988–89 season), one for a draw and zero for a defeat. Goal difference is used to separate teams on the same points, having replaced goal average at the start of the 1978–79 season.

From the 1994–95 to 2013–14 seasons the Regional League, along with the Midland Football Combination, served as one of the two official feeders to the Midland Football Alliance. The highest-placed team which met the Alliance's entry requirements was promoted to the Alliance, and one or more teams were relegated into the Regional League from the Alliance depending on the number of clubs remaining in each league.  In 2014 the Alliance and Combination merged to form the Midland League, and the Regional League now acts as a feeder to the top division of that league.  Prior to the 2006–07 season, the Regional League's top division was defined as a step 7 league within the National League System (NLS), even though it fed into the Alliance, which was graded as step 5. In 2006 the Regional League was re-graded by the Football Association as a step 6 league. Teams in the top two divisions are eligible to take part in the FA Cup and FA Vase as long as their grounds meet the required standards.

Since re-organisation in 1994, the Regional League has accepted applications for membership from successful teams in smaller local leagues within its catchment area. Leagues whose clubs joined the Regional League include the Shropshire County League, the Herefordshire League, the Wolverhampton Combination, and the Kidderminster & District League. Several ambitious local Sunday league teams also switched to Saturday play and entered the league. Bewdley Town, Bromyard Town and Ellesmere Rangers all joined from county leagues since 1994 and subsequently gone on to gain promotion to the Premier Division. Regional League teams could also theoretically be relegated to the local leagues but in practice this almost never happens. The only teams in recent history to drop down to a county league have been Leominster Town, Kington Town and Hinton, who dropped down to the Herefordshire League in 2004, 2006 and 2007 respectively, although all three clubs resigned voluntarily in favour of playing in a more local league as opposed to being relegated due to finishing at the bottom of the table. Owing to most of the league's Premier Division clubs' promotions to Step 5 leagues or transfers to other Step 6 divisions as part of restructuring the NLS ahead of the 2021–22 season, the WMRL was reduced to two divisions and lost its place at Step 6, becoming a new NLS regional feeder.

Attendance
At one time the league attracted large crowds for matches, with 3,000 spectators watching a match between Coventry City and Shrewsbury Town in 1899.  By the early 1960s, despite the league's decline in status, Kidderminster Harriers were still able to attract crowds of around 1,000 fans for home matches.  In the modern era, however, crowds are much smaller.  In the 1993–94 season Rocester averaged around 100 fans for home games, and several of the team's away matches drew crowds of less than 40.  Attendance figures are not currently published for league fixtures, but in the FA Vase in the 2005–06 season home attendances for Regional League teams averaged around 50, with only Wellington's match against Alvechurch of the then-existent Midland Alliance drawing over 100 spectators.

Current members
The member clubs of the league for the 2022–23 season are as follows:

Division One
Allscott Heath
Bromyard Town
Bustleholme
Dudley Athletic
Dudley Sports
FC Darlaston
Gornal Athletic
Gornal Colts
Kidderminster Harriers academy
Saltley Stallions
Sikh Hunters
Tipton Town
Warstones Wanderers
Wellington Amateurs
Wrens Nest
Wyrley United

Division Two
AFC Bentley
Bewdley Town reserves
Bilston Town reserves
Edgbaston Spartans
FC Premier 2008
Kidderminster Harriers reserves
Oldbury United
PS Olympic
Pelsall Villa Colts
Punjab United
Redditch United academy
Stourbridge Standard
Stourport Swifts reserves
Wombourne Allstars

League champions

Birmingham & District League
Initially the league consisted of a single division

Between 1915 and 1919 the competition was suspended due to the First World War.

Due to the number of teams having dropped dramatically, the 1938–39 season consisted of two separate "half-season" leagues.  The Keys Cup was contested until Christmas and the League Cup for the remainder of the season.

The 1939–40 season was abandoned due to the outbreak of the Second World War and the league did not resume operations until 1946.

For the 1954–55 season the league was split into two regional sections.

For the 1955–56 season the league was re-organised into Division One and Division Two.

The league reverted to a single-division format for the 1960–61 season.

West Midlands (Regional) League

For the 1965–66 season the league reverted to a two-division format, now comprising the Premier Division and Division One.

For the 1976–77 season Division One was split into 'A' and 'B' sections.

For the 1977–78 season Division One (A) and Division One (B) were re-organised into Division One and Division Two.

For the 1993–94 season Division Two was discontinued.

For the 1996–97 season Division One was split into two regional sections.

For the 2004–05 season Division One (North) and Division One (South) were re-organised back into Division One and Division Two.

For the 2021–22 season the league was reduced to two divisions and lost its Premier Division.

References

External links
FA Full Time page

 
1889 establishments in England
Football in the West Midlands (county)
Football in Shropshire
Football in Staffordshire
Football in Worcestershire
Football in Herefordshire
Football leagues in England
Sports leagues established in 1889